Calliotrochus is a genus of sea snails, marine gastropod mollusks in the subfamily Stomatellinae of the family Trochidae, the top snails.

Description
This genus consists of thin, small, shining globose species with a turbinate shape. It has rounded, smooth or spirally striate, convex whorls. The aperture is rounded. The outer lip and columella are simple, thin and arcuate. The umbilicus is narrow.

Species
Species within the genus Calliotrochus include:
 Calliotrochus marmoreus (Pease, 1861)

The following species were brought into synonymy:
 Calliotrochus excellens Iredale, 1937: synonym of Calliotrochus marmoreus (Pease, 1861)
 Calliotrochus legrandi May, W.L. 1921: synonym of Minopa legrandi (Petterd, 1879)
 Calliotrochus normalis Iredale, 1937: synonym of Calliotrochus marmoreus (Pease, 1861)
 Calliotrochus symbolicus Iredale, 1937: synonym of Calliotrochus marmoreus (Pease, 1861)
 Calliotrochus tasmanicus May, W.L. 1923: synonym of Nanula tasmanica (Petterd, 1879)

References

 Gatliff, J.H. & Gabriel, C.J., 1922. Additions to and alterations in the Catalogue of Victorian Marine Mollusca. Proc. R. Soc. Vict.n.s., 34(2):128-161.
 Herbert, D.G., 1998. Revision of the genus Calliotrochus Fischer, 1879 (Gastropoda: Trochoidea). Invertebrate Taxonomy, 12:545-565.

External links

 
Trochidae
Monotypic gastropod genera